Junior Antonio Sánchez Rivero (born 1 June 1989 in Barquisimeto, Venezuela) is a Venezuelan weightlifter. He competed in the 69 kg event at the 2012 Summer Olympics and finished fifth. Sánchez won the silver medal in the 69kg event of the 2011 Pan American Games.

References

Venezuelan male weightlifters
Weightlifters at the 2012 Summer Olympics
Olympic weightlifters of Venezuela
1989 births
Living people
Weightlifters at the 2015 Pan American Games
Pan American Games medalists in weightlifting
Pan American Games silver medalists for Venezuela
Medalists at the 2015 Pan American Games
Medalists at the 2011 Pan American Games
Sportspeople from Barquisimeto
21st-century Venezuelan people